The Kantonspolizei Zürich (literal translation: "Cantonal Police of Zürich") is the police department of the canton of Zürich in Switzerland. The Kantonspolizei Zürich exists within the cantonal legal structure to enforce criminal, security, and traffic law on behalf of the government of the canton of Zürich. It is empowered with the executive authority of the Direktion der Justiz und des Innern, the Department of Justice and Home Affairs of the Canton of Zürich.

History
The Kantonspolizei Zürich was established in 1804 as the Landjäger-Corps des Kantons Zürich after the period of civil unrest known as the Bockenkrieg.[de] Its administrative seat was formed in the City of Zürich in 1901.

In the same year, the Kantonspolizei founded the first museum of crime to exist in Switzerland, the Kriminalmuseum der Kantonspolizei Zürich. The museum, originally used only for training of new recruits, opened to the public in 1958. 

The Kantonspolizei Zürich is the legally responsible police force in all municipalities in the canton of Zürich, including the City of Zürich, for matters pertaining to cantonal law.

Duties
The Kantonspolizei Zürich is responsible for law enforcement at the Zurich Airport, as well as anti-terror protection in the widest sense and the control of potentially dangerous demonstrations and riots. One notable incident of major police action was the Opernhauskrawalle youth protest on 30/31 May 1980 at the Sechseläutenplatz in Zürich, documented in the 2000 Swiss documentary film Züri brännt. Another incident was the 1968 Globuskrawalle, rioting that took place at the former Globus department store building at the Bahnhofbrücke Zürich.

Further duties of the Kantonspolizei Zürich include the support of its municipal police stations, road patrol and control, criminal investigation, and water policing on Lake Zürich.

|

The Kantonspolizei Zürich is the largest police force in Switzerland, counting both personnel and financing. It comprises 3,800 full-time positions, of which 2,247 are police officers, including about 100 Sicherheitsassistenten (security assistants) at the Zurich Airport, as of January 2015. The KZ also provides the ePolice internet service, and has run the Kriminalmuseum (criminal museum) in its headquarters since 1959. It maintains an international exchange program with police forces in other countries.

References

External links 

  
 Website of the Government of the Canton of Zürich 
 Website of the Zürich Airport Police 

Canton of Zürich
History of Zürich
Law enforcement agencies of Switzerland
1804 establishments in Switzerland
Organizations established in 1804